The Strange Case of Wilhelm Reich is a 2013 Austrian film about Wilhelm Reich directed by Antonin Svoboda and starring Klaus Maria Brandauer as Reich.

Background
The title is a reference to the article with the same name of Mildred Edie Brady.

The director of the film Antonin Svoboda made also a documentary about Wilhelm Reich with the title Who is afraid of Wilhelm Reich.

References

External links
 

Wilhelm Reich
English-language Austrian films
Austrian biographical films
Films about psychoanalysis